How I Killed Pluto and Why It Had It Coming is the 2010 memoir by Mike Brown, the American astronomer most responsible for the reclassification of Pluto from planet to dwarf planet.

Summary 
The memoir is an account of the events surrounding the redefinition of the term planet that eventually changed the status of Pluto. It chronicles the discovery of Eris, a dwarf planet then mistakenly thought to be larger than Pluto, located within the scattered disc, beyond Neptune's orbit. The replaying of events includes the adversarial challenging of long-held scientific beliefs between some of the world's leading astronomers, and the eventual 2006 International Astronomical Union's vote that removed Pluto from the list of Solar System planets.

Reviews 
Reviews of the book have been generally positive, with James Kennedy of The Wall Street Journal calling the book a "brisk" and "enjoyable ... chronicle" of the tale of the search for new planets and the eventual demotion of Pluto from planetary status. Janet Maslin of The New York Times called it a "short, eager-to-please research memoir".

See also
 List of former planets

References

Bibliography
 

2010 non-fiction books
Astronomy books
Pluto's planethood
American memoirs
Michael E. Brown